Boris RED is an integrated 3D compositing, titling, and effects application that works with the Adobe Creative Suite, Avid, Apple, Grass Valley, Media 100 and Sony editing systems. RED adds features to NLE timelines and integrates a standalone engine for effects creation and rendering.

Features
64-bit Support
Boris RED 5 adds support for 64-bit video editing applications such as Adobe Premiere Pro CS5.5 and CS5, Adobe After Effects CS5.5 and CS5 (Windows), and Sony Vegas Pro v11 and v10.

Final Effects Complete Filters
40 filters added to RED from Boris Final Effects Complete.

Quality Image Restoration
Added quality image restoration tools such as: Noise Reduction, Smooth Tone, Pixel Fixer, DV Fixer,

3D Particle Effects
Added Particle Array 3D and Pin Art filters.

UpRez
Added SD to HD quality converter.

3-Way Color Grade
Added filter which color grades video footage. The filter also has masking and keying tools to isolate areas of secondary color correction.

Lens Blur
The multi-core optimized lens blur filter emulates the circular or multi-sided iris shaped highlights that are generated with real camera lenses.

Lens Shape
The multi-processor accelerated BCC Lens Shape filter to generate stylized image highlights that take their shape from an alternate alpha image source.

Lens Transition
The multi-processor accelerated BCC Lens Transition filter automatically generates a stylized transition between a pair of image clips.

Swish Pan
The BCC Swish Pan transition emulates panning a camera in a 180 degree arc, creating the look of a fast blur between the outgoing and the incoming clips.

Stylized Effects
New OpenGL-accelerated effects include: LED, Damaged TV, Tile Mosaic, Scan Lines, Prism, Lightning, Glare, Glint, Glitter, and Lens Flare.

Painterly Effects
Simulate pencil-sketched images, the wash look of a water color painting, a rotoscope toon-animation look, and charcoal drawings.

Effects
The latest version of Boris RED contains the following Boris Continuum Complete (BCC) effects:

The latest version of Boris RED contains the following Boris Final Effects Complete effects:

References

Adobe Inc.